Alexis Ord, also known as Lecki Ord, was Lord Mayor of Melbourne from 1987 to 1988. She was the first woman to hold that position. Ord has been involved in several community activist groups, such as the Friends of the ABC, founding member of the Women's Planning Network, and the environmental movement.

Work

Ord was an architect by training. Her interests were primarily in planning issues and environmental sustainability. This interest is evident during her time at architecture school where her Carlton terrace-house was "the central driving force" behind the Association of Architecture Schools of Australasia student conference in 1964.

References

Mayors and Lord Mayors of Melbourne
Women mayors of places in Victoria (Australia)
Living people
Australian women architects
20th-century Australian architects
Year of birth missing (living people)
20th-century Australian women
21st-century Australian women
21st-century Australian people